Fms-related tyrosine kinase 4, also known as FLT4, is a protein which in  humans is encoded by the FLT4 gene.

This gene encodes a tyrosine kinase receptor for vascular endothelial growth factors C and D. The protein is thought to be involved in lymphangiogenesis and maintenance of the lymphatic endothelium. Mutations in this gene cause hereditary lymphedema type IA.

Interactions 

FLT4 has been shown to interact with SHC1.

See also 
 VEGF receptors

References

Further reading

External links 
  GeneReviews/NCBI/NIH/UW entry on Milroy Disease

Tyrosine kinase receptors